Madurai Veeran is a folk deity popular in southern Tamil Nadu, India.

Madurai Veeran may also refer to:
Madurai Veeran (2007 film), a 2007 Tamil film directed by Vincent Selva
Madurai Veeran (1956 film), a 1956 Tamil film directed by D. Yoganand
Madurai Veeran (1939 film), a  1939 Tamil film directed by T. P. Rajalakshmi

See also 
Madura Veeran, a 2018 Tamil film directed by P. G. Muthiah